Let's Dance 2022 is the seventeenth season of Swedish Let's Dance. It premiered on 19 March 2022 on TV4. Petra Mede and David Lindgren returns as presenters.

Contestants
Marie Mandelmann became the first confirmed celebrity dancer on 19 February.

Scoring chart

Red numbers indicate the lowest score of each week.
Green numbers indicate the highest score of each week.
 indicates the couple that was eliminated that week.
 indicates the couple received the lowest score of the week and was eliminated.
 indicates the couple withdrew from the competition.
 indicates the couple returned to the competition after previously being eliminated.
 indicates the couple finished in the bottom two.
 indicates the couple earned immunity from elimination.
 indicates the winning couple.
 indicates the runner-up couple.
 indicates the third place couple.

Average chart

References 

2022
2022 Swedish television seasons
TV4 (Sweden) original programming